Oriana Small, known professionally as Ashley Blue, is an American pornographic actress.
She is a member of the AVN Hall of Fame, has hosted her own Vivid Radio show and written for Hustler magazine.
In 2008, she published a memoir of her career in the adult entertainment industry, titled Girlvert: A Porno Memoir.

Career
Blue has won multiple Adult Video News awards, including 2004 Female Performer of the Year and 2005 Best Supporting Actress. In March 2004, she signed a three-year contract with JM Productions, appearing in the Girlvert series. She ended the contract on February 14, 2007.

In 2003, she sued ex-boyfriend and fellow former adult film star Trent Tesoro on an episode of Judge Mathis. She was featured in Inside the Porn Actors Studio: Ashley Blue (2006), an episode of Howard Stern's TV series Howard Stern on Demand.  She also did voice acting for the cartoon Three Thug Mice.

Blue has hosted her own Vivid Radio show and written for Hustler magazine.
In 2008, she finished writing her memoir of nearly ten years working in the adult entertainment industry (using her JM Productions moniker "Girlvert"). It was published as Girlvert: A Porno Memoir by Los Angeles-based independent publisher A Barnacle Book & Record in 2011.

In 2011, Blue and other pornographic film actresses modeled for a series of paintings by Swedish artist Karl Backman.
She was inducted into the AVN Hall of Fame in 2013 and XRCO Hall of Fame in 2021.

Awards
2003 XRCO Award for Cream Dream
2004 AVN Award for Female Performer of the Year
2004 AVN Award for Best All-Girl Sex Scene (Video) – The Violation of Jessica Darlin (with Jessica Darlin, Brandi Lyons, Lana Moore, Hollie Stevens, Crystal Ray, &  Flick Shagwell)
2004 XRCO Award for Female Performer of the Year
2004 Adam Film World Guide Award for Best Actress (Video) – Girlvert 4
2005 AVN Award for Best Supporting Actress (Video) – Adore
2005 AVN Award for Best All-Girl Sex Scene (Video) – The Violation of Audrey Hollander (with Audrey Hollander, Gia Paloma, Tyla Wynn, Brodi, & Kelly Kline)
2005 XRCO Award for Best Girl/Girl Scene – The Violation of Audrey Hollander (with Audrey Hollander, Gia Paloma, Tyla Wynn, Brodi, & Kelly Kline)
2005 Adam Film World Guide Award for Female Performer of the Year
2007 AVN Award for Most Outrageous Sex Scene – Girlvert 11 (with Amber Wild & Steven French)
2013 AVN Hall of Fame
2021 XRCO Hall of Fame

References

External links

 
 
 
 

Year of birth missing (living people)
American magazine writers
American pornographic film actresses
Living people
Pornographic film actors from California
Radio personalities from California
20th-century births
21st-century American women